Hércules de Alicante Club de Fútbol, S.A.D. is a Spanish football team in Alicante, in the Valencian Community. Founded on 25 October 1922, it currently plays in Segunda División RFEF – Group 3 and plays its home games at the 29,500-capacity Estadio José Rico Pérez.

History

Hercules C.F. has been documented since 1914 although not officially registered until 26 September 1922, alongside Mercantil de Cartagena, Federación Levantina and others. Its founder was Vicente Pastor Alfosea dubbed "El Chepa". In its early days, the club played in various locations, the foothills of la montañosa, the lands of l'Hort del tio Ron, the campo de Benalúa or the facilities of the Alicante Recreation Club.

Hercules joined a youth league, becoming champion in 1918. The first official match was in 1919 against Athletic Club Benaluense, Hercules winning 2–1. At first the team played in white and red striped shirts and black pants.

After first appearing in La Liga in the 1935–36 season, Hércules would play sporadically in the category for the next 40 years, playing mainly in the second division but going as low as the third. From 1961 to 1969, neighbours Alicante acted as its feeder club.

After a ten-year spell in the top flight, encompassing 12 seasons in the 1970s and '80s, the club only returned again in the 1996–97 campaign. Though eventually relegated, it managed two remarkable comeback wins over Barcelona, which ultimately handed the Liga title to Real Madrid.

In 2004–05, after five years in the third level, Hércules finished second, being subsequently promoted to the "silver category". After posting three consecutive solid seasons, the club narrowly missed out on a return to the top division in 2009, finishing fourth, three points behind last-promotee Tenerife.

The 2009–10 campaign saw Hércules promoted back into the top flight after 14 years in dramatic fashion: losing 0–1 at half-time at Rayo Vallecano, the team fought back to win 2–1 in the penultimate game of the season and leap frogged Real Betis into third place. In the last round, a 2–0 away win against relegation-threatened Real Unión guaranteed promotion, with the 4–0 win of Betis over Levante eventually counting for nothing (all three teams – Levante, Hércules and Betis – ended equal on points).

Early into the 2010–11 season, one year, three months and 19 days after Barcelona's last home defeat in the league, Hércules recorded a shock 2–0 win at the Camp Nou thanks to a brace from Nelson Valdez – Barcelona had won their last 11 home matches, scored at least three times in each of their last six league fixtures and were protecting a 17-game unbeaten streak. This was the Alicante outfit's third successive win over the Barcelona, having won both meetings in their previous top flight campaign 14 years before.

In the 2013–14 campaign, they were relegated to the Segunda División B after finishing in last place in the Segunda División.

In the 2016–17 Copa del Rey, the team drew 1–1 with Barcelona. In the second match at the Camp Nou (Barcelona's home), Hércules was defeated by the Catalonian side 7–0.

Season to season

20 seasons in La Liga
43 seasons in Segunda División
18 seasons in Segunda División B
1 season in Segunda División RFEF
7 seasons in Tercera División

Players

Current squad

Former coaches

Relationships with other teams
  Iraklis – Since 2003, fans of both teams formed a friendship through the Internet, because "Iraklis" is a Greek name for "Hercules", the Roman name for Heracles, the Greek god of strength. There is even a Hércules supporters club that bears the name Iraklis, in honor of their friendship. They also have a newly formed partnership with St Johnstone FC of Scotland.

See also
Hércules CF B
Ciudad de Alicante Trophy

References

External links

 
Futbolme team profile 
BDFutbol team profile
Macho Hércules, fansite 
Club & Stadium History at Estadios de España  

 
Football clubs in the Valencian Community
Association football clubs established in 1922
1922 establishments in Spain
Sport in Alicante
Segunda División clubs
La Liga clubs